Weiden an der March is a municipality in the district of Gänserndorf in Lower Austria, Austria.

Geography
Weiden an der March lies in the Weinviertel in Lower Austria. It lies near the river Morava, which forms the border with Slovakia. 19.63% of the municipality is forested.

On 1 January 1975 the former municipalities of Baumgarten an der March, Oberweiden and Zwerndorf were merged to form Weiden an der March.

Population

Economy
There are 26 companies in Weiden, and 403 persons are employed. The employment rate in 2001 was 45.79%.

References

Cities and towns in Gänserndorf District
Croatian communities in Austria